The Battle of Cape Lopez was fought in early 1722 during the Golden Age of Piracy. A Royal Navy man-of-war under Captain Chaloner Ogle defeated the pirate ship of Bartholomew Roberts off the coast of Gabon, West Africa.

Background
Roberts was the most successful pirate of the Golden Age; he captured well over 400 vessels ranging from small fishing boats to large frigates. In April 1721, Roberts, also known as "Black Bart", was sailing the coast of Martinique when he came across a French frigate of fifty-two guns and captured her. Aboard the vessel was the governor of the French colony who was hanged by Roberts from the yardarm of his ship. This act proved to be his downfall as it was apparently the final straw. In retaliation for Black Bart's repeated attacks on fleets of merchant ships and his killing of the governor, the French Navy and the Royal Navy dispatched several warships to hunt the pirates. Roberts and his men captured the two French warships off the Senegal Rivers mouth, the sixteen-gun sloop-of-war Comte de Toulouse and a ten-gun brig. Comte de Toulouse was renamed the Ranger and the brig Little Ranger. After taking the two Frenchmen, the pirates sailed southeast for the present day Gabon.

While on the way, off the Pepper Coast Roberts sighted and captured the Royal Africa Company frigate Onslow which he renamed the Royal Fortune. The frigate mounted over forty guns and the crew consisted of about 250 men, black and white. Black Bart's luck was soon to run out though, as two Royal Navy men-of-war began patrolling the waters of West Africa, at about the same time, Roberts anchored in Cape Lopez for careening. The Royal Navy vessels on patrol were the fourth-rates HMS Swallow and HMS Weymouth, both mounting fifty guns or more but only the Swallow under Captain Chaloner Ogle encountered Black Bart. When Captain Ogle sailed around the cape he sighted four vessels, three of them pirates and one a merchant ship  the Neptune belonging to a Captain Hill, which was illegally trading with the brigands. Ogle spotted a sandbar and quickly ordered his ship to turn out of the way, at the same time raising a Portuguese flag. By this time the pirates had spotted the Swallow so Roberts allowed Captain James Skyrme in the Ranger to capture what he thought was a fleeing merchant ship.

Sensing an opportunity, Captain Ogle chose to let the pirate chase him for several hours until they were far away from the cape and land was no longer in sight. Ogle then turned about, raised the White Ensign and engaged Captain Skyrme, who still did not realize the Swallow was a Royal Navy frigate. After a relatively short action, the sloop was captured, made a prize, and ten pirates were killed. Ogle then patiently sailed back to Cape Lopez where he arrived five days later on February 10, 1722.

Battle

According to legend, at this time Black Bart Roberts was eating breakfast of salmagundi with Captain Hill of the captured ship Neptune aboard the Royal Fortune when one of his crew shouted that the Ranger was returning from her chase with the merchant ship. A few moments later they discovered the incoming vessel was not their sloop but the Swallow. One of the pirates, a man named Armstrong who had absconded from the Swallow's sister ship Weymouth at Madeira, recognized the Royal Navy frigate and told Captain Roberts. Without fear Roberts boarded the Royal Fortune and as he did before all of his battles, he dressed in his finest clothing, a red damask waistcoat and a red feather in his hat, and began organizing his escape. Most of the crew from the Little Ranger was ordered to join the crew of the Royal Fortune so as to keep as many pirates as possible aboard the flagship for defense. The Little Ranger which was hauled on her side being cleaned at the time, was abandoned.  When the pirates left, Captain Hill's crew went aboard the Little Ranger and looted gold and other valuables, and sailed off for Prince's Island (São Tomé and Príncipe).

Roberts' plan called for him to sail directly for the Swallow in order to quickly pass her and then escape. By doing this the Swallow would have to turn about to engage or chase the Royal Fortune which would give Roberts valuable time to flee. The plan however had one default, by sailing right past the Royal Navy frigate, the Royal Fortune would be exposed to one of Swallows deadly broadsides. Captain Roberts set out for his escape and issued the command for Little Ranger and the merchantman to leave. The following action ended badly for the pirates. When Royal Fortune was off Swallows beam, she released a massive broadside which raked the ship. The pirates opened fire and then an additional broadside from the Swallow raked the deck where Black Bart was commanding.  The pirates got clear and ran ahead of the wind, leaving the Swallow behind.  The action took place during a fierce tropical storm, and just as the Royal Fortune seemed to have escaped the ship hit the 'eye' of the storm, and were suddenly becalmed for half an hour.  This gave the unaffected Swallow time to catch up, and when they were in range, they fired their swivels (guns mounted on the bow which fired grapeshot) at the Royal Fortune.  Three men died, one of them being Bartholomew Roberts.  A piece of shot no bigger than a penny, hit him in the throat, severed his spinal column, and he died instantly.  He settled down onto a gun, to initial observers that he was taking a rest but when the smoke had cleared away Black Bart was dead and Captain Ogle later allowed his crew to bury him at sea, which they did in all his finery, including a diamond studded six inch cross on a chain which he wore around his neck.

The pirates, determined to avenge their captain, slowed down their vessel and turned around to continue the engagement. According to some accounts the action lasted for around three hours before cannon fire from the ship of the line dismasted the pirate frigate and allowed boarding. Royal Fortunes colors were struck by force and the remaining pirates were arrested.

Aftermath

Bartholomew Roberts was killed at the very beginning of the battle during the second broadside unleashed by the ship of the line. Several men were killed or wounded on both sides and 272 pirates taken prisoner in all. Many were wounded and died in captivity on their way to the prison of Cape Coast Castle. Fifty-four pirates were hanged for their deeds and thirty-seven were punished less severely. Of the 272 captured pirates, 65 were former African slaves that Roberts had emancipated, and they were sold back into slavery. Seventeen went to Marshalsea prison in London and twenty became indentured servants for the Royal African Company. Dozens of pirates escaped punishment as they were forced into a life with Roberts' pirates to begin with. Captain Chaloner Ogle benefitted from the battle significantly, besides being knighted and becoming an admiral he took off several ounces of gold dust from the Ranger and the Royal Fortune. After defeating Roberts, Captain Ogle intended to sail back and take the Little Ranger which was also carrying gold but she and the merchantman escaped and it is said that Captain Hill received most of the remaining gold. With the death of "Black Bart", piracy in the Atlantic Ocean died off and the Golden Age ended by 1730.

References

Roberts, V'leOnica, The True & Complete Memoirs of Pirate Captain Bartholomew Roberts aka Black Bart (2004) 
Cordingly, David, Under the Black Flag: The Romance and Reality of Life Among the Pirates Harcourt Brace: New York (1995)
Rich, Jeremy, A Workman Is Worthy of His Meat: Food and Colonialism in the Gabon Estuary. Lincoln: University of Nebraska Press (2007) 
Reader, John, Africa: A Biography of the Continent. Hamish Hamilton (1997) 
A General History of the Pyrates by Captain Charles Johnson (1724)

Piracy in the Atlantic Ocean
Cape Lopez
Cape Lopez
Cape Lopez
Cape Lopez
1722 in Africa